Martensia elegans is a red alga species in the genus Martensia. It is a common South African south coast species, extending into KwaZulu-Natal at least as far as Sodwana Bay.

References

External links 

Flora of South Africa
Plants described in 1841
Delesseriaceae